The Eğirdir minnow or Handlirsch's minnow  (Pseudophoxinus handlirschi) (in Turkish ciçek), is a species of freshwater fish in the family Cyprinidae. It was endemic to Lake Eğirdir in Turkey, but is now considered extinct. It was earlier critically endangered due to predation by pike perch which had been introduced to the lake, but has not been found since 1980s and was therefore evaluated by IUCN as extinct in 2013.

References

External links

Pseudophoxinus
Endemic fauna of Turkey
Fish described in 1933
Taxonomy articles created by Polbot
Taxa named by Viktor Pietschmann